Scoparia gallica is a species of moth in the family Crambidae. It is found in France, Spain and Switzerland.

The wingspan is 25–27 mm for males and 20–23 mm for females.

References

Moths described in 1873
Scorparia
Moths of Europe